Cane Island is a planned community on the westside of the City of Katy. It is north of Interstate 10. Rise Communities is developing Cane Island.

Rise Communities is developing the community. Groundbreaking of the first portion occurred on November 19, 2014, and this portion was scheduled to open in the middle of 2015.

The entirety of the community was previously in an unincorporated area of Waller County, in the extraterritorial jurisdictions of the cities of Katy and Houston. On April 27, 2015, the City of Katy city council voted to annex  of land in three separate tracts.

Composition

Cane Island Parkway; the primary road into the subdivision, began development in 2014. Since the road did not go all the way into the community, persons accessing Cane Island had to use a detour through U.S. Highway 90. In 2017 the final extension was nearing completion.

There will be a 22-house gated enclave of Cane Island called "Estates at Cane Island."

Education
The community is a part of the Katy Independent School District.  (spring) Katy Elementary School, Katy Junior High School, and Katy High School serve sections of the community. Bryant Elementary School is scheduled to open in fall 2017 and will serve the community. There is an elementary school within the development that will be built.

Area private schools include Aristoi Classical Academy, Faith West Academy, Mirus Academy, and Saint John XXIII High School (formerly Pope John XXIII High School).

References

External links
 Cane Island

Populated places in Waller County, Texas